Leo Kahn may refer to:
 Leo Kahn (painter)
 Leo Kahn (entrepreneur)